Andrew Clement Serkis (born 20 April 1964) is an English actor, director and producer. He is best known for his performance capture roles comprising motion capture acting, animation and voice work for computer-generated characters such as Gollum in The Lord of the Rings film trilogy (2001–2003) and The Hobbit: An Unexpected Journey (2012), King Kong in the eponymous 2005 film, Caesar in the Planet of the Apes reboot trilogy (2011–2017), Captain Haddock / Sir Francis Haddock in Steven Spielberg's The Adventures of Tintin (2011), Baloo in his self-directed film Mowgli: Legend of the Jungle (2018) and Supreme Leader Snoke in the Star Wars sequel trilogy films The Force Awakens (2015) and The Last Jedi (2017), also portraying Kino Loy in the Star Wars Disney+ series Andor (2022).

Serkis is the eighth highest-grossing actor of all time, and his film work in motion capture has been critically acclaimed. He has received an Empire Award and two Saturn Awards for his motion-capture acting. He earned a Golden Globe nomination for his portrayal of serial killer Ian Brady in the British television film Longford (2006) and was nominated for a BAFTA for his portrayal of new wave and punk rock musician Ian Dury in the biopic Sex & Drugs & Rock & Roll (2010). In 2020, Serkis received the BAFTA Award for Outstanding British Contribution To Cinema. In 2021, he won a Daytime Emmy Award for the series The Letter for the King (2020).

Serkis portrayed Ulysses Klaue in the Marvel Cinematic Universe (MCU) films Avengers: Age of Ultron (2015) and Black Panther (2018), as well as the Disney+ series What If…? (2021). He has played Alfred Pennyworth in The Batman (2022). Serkis has his own production company and motion capture workshop, The Imaginarium in London, which he used for Mowgli: Legend of the Jungle. He made his directorial debut with Imaginarium's 2017 film Breathe. He directed Venom: Let There Be Carnage (2021), which is set in Sony's Spider-Man Universe (SSU).

Early life
Serkis was born on 20 April 1964 in Ruislip Manor in Middlesex (now within Greater London). He grew up in a combination of Ruislip and Baghdad, Iraq. His mother, Lylie Weech, was half Iraqi and half English, and taught disabled children; his father, Clement Serkis, was an Iraqi-Armenian gynaecologist. His parents are Catholic. His ancestors' original surname was "Sarkisian". His father often worked abroad in the Middle East, while Serkis and his siblings were raised in Britain, with regular holidays in the Middle Eastern cities of Tyre, Sidon, Damascus and Baghdad.

Serkis was educated at St Benedict's School, Ealing. He studied visual arts and theatre as part of his degree at Lancaster University and graduated in 1985. Serkis was a member of The County College and part of the student radio station Bailrigg FM. He joined the Nuffield Studio, getting involved in designing and producing plays.

Having agreed to act in a couple of productions towards the end of his first year, Serkis played the lead role in Barrie Keeffe's play Gotcha as a rebellious teenager holding a teacher hostage. As a result, he changed his major subject to acting, constructing his Independent Studies Degree around acting and set design, studying Konstantin Stanislavski and Bertolt Brecht, and including minor modules in art and visual graphics. In his final year at Lancaster he adapted Raymond Briggs's graphic novel The Tin-Pot Foreign General and the Old Iron Woman, a satire about the Falklands War, as a one-man show, which he performed to acclaim.

Career
In his third year at university, Serkis joined the backstage team at the local Duke's Playhouse to earn his Equity card. On graduating, although advised to take a one-year post-graduate acting course, he joined Dukes as an actor. Under director Jonathan Petherbridge, who used workshops based on the methods of Augusto Boal, he spent 18 months acting in a broad range of productions from Brecht, Shakespeare and modern British playwrights. 

After 16 months, and having gained his Equity card, Serkis joined a series of touring companies, including productions of: Bouncers opposite Hull Truck; Florizel in The Winter's Tale; and the fool in King Lear with director Max Stafford-Clark. In the early 1990s he settled in London, and took a role in April de Angelis' Hush (Royal Court) as Dogboy. Also the Royal Court Theatre's production of Mojo, and Wilson Milam's production of Hurlyburly (1997) at the Queen's Theatre, Shaftesbury Avenue, with Rupert Graves and David Tennant. Serkis also developed a career in television, appearing in small roles such as Greville in an episode of The Darling Buds of May (1992) and a criminal called Maxwell in an episode of Pie in the Sky (1994). Serkis joined director Mike Leigh's ensemble for two film productions, and appeared in the romantic comedy Loop (1997) alongside Susannah York. Serkis portrayed Victorian choreographer John D'Auban in Topsy-Turvy, a 1999 film about Gilbert and Sullivan's creation of The Mikado. In 1999, Serkis played Bill Sikes in ITV's adaption of Oliver Twist. He appeared alongside Sacha Baron Cohen in The Jolly Boys' Last Stand in 2000.

Serkis first came to wide public notice for his performance as Sméagol / Gollum, in The Lord of the Rings film trilogy (2001–2003), for which he provided motion capture movements and voice for the CGI character. His work on The Lord of the Rings started a debate on the legitimacy of CGI-assisted acting. Some critics felt Serkis should have been nominated for the Academy Award for Best Supporting Actor, since his voice, body language and facial expressions were used.

Serkis has performed motion capture work in several other films, including the title character in the 2005 version of King Kong (in which he also played the ship's cook in live action) and as Caesar in Rise of the Planet of the Apes (2011), Dawn of the Planet of the Apes (2014), and War for the Planet of the Apes (2017). He also worked with game developers Ninja Theory on the 2007 release Heavenly Sword, providing the motion capture and voice for King Bohan (the game's main villain).

In 2006, Serkis starred as serial killer Ian Brady in the BAFTA-nominated Longford, co-starring Samantha Morton as Myra Hindley and Jim Broadbent as Lord Longford. That same year, Serkis appeared in the role of Mr. Grin in the film rendition of Anthony Horowitz's Alex Rider novel Stormbreaker. He also acted in the film The Prestige as Mr. Alley (assistant to Nikola Tesla), as the voice of one of the henchrats in the Aardman Animations film Flushed Away named Spike, and appeared in Jim Threapleton's improvised feature film Extraordinary Rendition, which premiered in 2007. In 2007, he appeared in Sugarhouse, a low-budget independently made film, playing local crime lord Hoodwink, who terrorises an east London housing estate. For the role, Serkis shaved his head and had sessions lasting 20 hours each to have temporary tattoos stencilled onto his body. The film premiered at the 2007 Edinburgh Festival and released in the UK on 24 August. Also that year, Serkis provided the voiceover for Monkey Life, on Five broadcast for three weeks from 13 to 31 August 2007. This series was about Monkey World, the popular ape and monkey sanctuary and zoo near Wool, Dorset. In the joint BBC/HBO production Einstein and Eddington, (2008) Serkis played Albert Einstein, following the development of his theory of relativity, while David Tennant played scientist Sir Arthur Eddington. In 2008, Serkis appeared as Rigaud in the BBC Television adaptation of Charles Dickens' Little Dorrit and as Capricorn in Inkheart, the film adaptation of Cornelia Funke's novel. In 2010, Serkis played 1970s new wave singer Ian Dury in Sex & Drugs & Rock & Roll.

Serkis reunited with Peter Jackson, as a cast member in Jackson's and Steven Spielberg's Tintin trilogy, based on The Adventures of Tintin. Serkis supplied the voice and motion capture performance of Captain Haddock (adopting a Scottish accent) as well as his ancestor, Sir Francis Haddock. Filming began in January 2009 and the film was released in 2011. Filming was due to begin in September 2008, but was delayed due to Universal pulling out of backing the project.

In 2009, Serkis voiced the role of the demon Screwtape in Focus on the Family's Radio Theatre audio adaptation of C. S. Lewis's The Screwtape Letters. In 2010, Serkis was cast as William Hare, with Simon Pegg as Burke, in the John Landis black comedy film Burke and Hare based on the Burke and Hare murders in Scotland in 1828. He also featured in the TV series The Accused, in "Liam's Story", written by Danny Brocklehurst and Jimmy McGovern. He played Caesar in the 20th Century Fox science-fiction film Rise of the Planet of the Apes. Serkis was acclaimed for his performance as Caesar in 2011, and in a high-profile campaign by 20th Century Fox for him to be honoured with a Best Supporting Actor Oscar nomination, his co-star James Franco stated: "Andy Serkis is the undisputed master of the newest kind of acting called 'performance capture,' and it is time that Serkis gets credit for the innovative artist that he is." In 2010, Serkis played Monkey, the lead character along with Lindsey Shaw in the videogame Enslaved: Odyssey to the West.

In January 2011, it was confirmed that Serkis would reprise the role of Gollum in The Hobbit: An Unexpected Journey the first film in the three-part The Hobbit films. It was released in 2012, and the follow-ups were released in 2013 and 2014. He was also the trilogy's second unit director, which included directing aerial shots and battle scenes. He was invited to join the Academy of Motion Picture Arts and Sciences in June 2012 along with 175 other individuals. In 2014, Serkis reprised his role as Caesar in Dawn of the Planet of the Apes, and again in 2017 for War for the Planet of the Apes, the last of the trilogy.

In Gareth Edwards' 2014 science-fiction monster film Godzilla, Serkis was the consultant on the film's motion capture sequences in order to "control the souls" of the creatures. Serkis played Ulysses Klaue in Marvel Studios' Avengers: Age of Ultron (2015), and was also a motion capture consultant on the film. He reprised the role in Marvel Studios' Black Panther (2018), and provided the voice in the sixth episode of Marvel's What If...?. He played Supreme Leader Snoke in Star Wars: The Force Awakens (2015) and reprised the role in Star Wars: The Last Jedi (2017), and Star Wars: The Rise of Skywalker (2019). Serkis appeared as the Ghost of Christmas Past in the 2019 BBC/FX three-part miniseries A Christmas Carol. In 2019, it was announced that Serkis would play Alfred Pennyworth in The Batman (2022).

In late 2015, it was announced that Serkis was working on a modern film adaptation of Rumpelstiltskin, titled Steelskin. In addition to starring in the film, Serkis will serve as producer and director.

In 2021, he received a Daytime Emmy Award for Outstanding Guest Performer in a Daytime Fiction Program for his role as Mayor of Mistrinaut, the father of his real life daughter Ruby's character, in the Netflix fantasy series The Letter for the King. Also for Netflix, Serkis is scheduled to star alongside Idris Elba and Cynthia Erivo in a new TV movie of Elba's show, Luther. 

In 2022, Serkis returned to the Star Wars franchise in a different, non-CGI role in the Disney+ television series Andor, as Kino Loy.

The Imaginarium Studios
In 2011, Serkis founded The Imaginarium Studios with film producer Jonathan Cavendish. The Imaginarium is a production company and creative digital studio based in Ealing, London and is dedicated to invention of believable, emotionally engaging digital characters using Performance Capture technology, in which Serkis specialises. On 20 October 2012, the studio acquired rights to The Bone Season by Samantha Shannon and a new motion capture adaptation of Animal Farm, which Serkis has confirmed is his next film he will be directing.

Directing
Serkis has served as the second unit director for The Hobbit films and made his directorial debut with Breathe. He also directed and starred in the film, Mowgli: Legend of the Jungle. In 2021, Serkis directed the sequel to Venom, titled, Venom: Let There Be Carnage. It was released on 1 October in the US and 15 October in the UK. In 2022, he was set to direct Animal Farm an animated adaptation of George Orwell's novel of the same name.

Other work
Serkis made an appearance in the music video for Neneh Cherry's "Woman", portraying an abusive boyfriend, in 1996. After portraying Gollum in The Lord of the Rings series, he published a memoir about his experiences, titled Gollum: How We Made Movie Magic, published in late 2004. In 2015, Serkis collaborated with rock band Coldplay in the making of the music video for "Adventure of a Lifetime". The group performed as chimpanzees with Serkis acting as a performance capture consultant.

In December 2018, he appeared in a video for People's Vote as UK Prime Minister Theresa May using the voice of Gollum, spoofing May's Brexit deal. He also appears in the BBC Earth programme, Neanderthals: Meet Your Ancestors.

Serkis, together with fellow Lord of the Rings castmates Sean Astin, Sean Bean, Orlando Bloom, Billy Boyd, Ian McKellen, Dominic Monaghan, Viggo Mortensen, Miranda Otto, John Rhys-Davies, Liv Tyler, Karl Urban and Elijah Wood, plus writer Philippa Boyens and director Peter Jackson, on 1 May 2020 joined Josh Gad's YouTube series Reunited Apart which reunites the cast of popular movies through video-conferencing due to the COVID-19 pandemic, and promotes donations to non-profit charities.

During the COVID-19 lockdown, on VE Day, Serkis read the entire book of The Hobbit to raise money for NHS Charities Together and Best Beginnings, a pregnancy charity of which he has been an ambassador. More than 650,000 people tuned in worldwide, and Serkis raised more than £283,000 ($351,000). On 2 July 2020, HarperCollinsUK announced that Serkis would professionally narrate The Hobbit again to be published for Audible. The audiobook was released on 3 September 2020 in the UK, published by HarperCollins, and 21 September in the US, published by Recorded Books. The cover art, by Alan Lee, was drawn specially for the release.                             

On 7 July 2021, HarperCollinsUK and Recorded Books announced Serkis would follow up his narration of The Hobbit with a professional recording of all three The Lord of the Rings novels that were released on 16 September. The CDs were released on 14 October 2021.

Serkis and producer Andrew Levitas will release a seven-part comic book series in 2022, titled Eternus, about Heracles, the son of Zeus, trying to identify Zeus's killer. The series will be published by Thunder Books.

Personal life

Serkis was born to Catholic parents, and though he has been an atheist since his teenage years, he is "drawn to the karmic possibilities of energy transference", specifically "the idea that your energy lives on after you".

Serkis married actress Lorraine Ashbourne in July 2002. He lives in Crouch End, North London with Ashbourne and their three children: Ruby (b. 1998), Sonny (b. 2000) and Louis (b. 2004), all of whom are actors. Louis and Ruby starred in the 2019 film The Kid Who Would Be King and the 2020 Netflix series The Letter for the King respectively. Serkis also starred alongside Ruby, and they played father and daughter. Louis also voiced Bhoot in Mowgli: Legend of the Jungle, which was directed by and co-starred his father as Baloo.

Filmography and accolades

Selected theatre
 The Porter in Macbeth. Directed by Braham Murray at the Royal Exchange, Manchester. (1988)
 Tony Lumpkin in She Stoops to Conquer by Oliver Goldsmith. Directed by James Maxwell at the Royal Exchange, Manchester. (1990)
 Sean Grogan in Your Home in the West by Rod Wooden. World premiere directed by Braham Murray at the Royal Exchange, Manchester. (1991)
 Doctor Jan Heart in Doctor Heart by Peter Muller. English premiere directed by Braham Murray at the Royal Exchange, Manchester. (1991)
 David in Unidentified Human Remains and the True Nature of Love by Brad Fraser. Directed by Braham Murray at the Royal Exchange, Manchester. (1995)
 Iago in Othello. Directed by Braham Murray at the Royal Exchange, Manchester. (2002)

See also 
 Motion-capture acting

References

External links

 Official website for The Imaginarium Studios
 
 Andy Serkis on Inkheart and Tintin at AMCtv.com
 Andy Serkis Interview
 The Jolly Boys Last Stand

 
1964 births
Living people
20th-century English male actors
21st-century English male actors
Alumni of Lancaster University
Alumni of County College, Lancaster
Audiobook narrators
BAFTA Outstanding British Contribution to Cinema Award
Daytime Emmy Award winners
English atheists
English male film actors
English male musical theatre actors
English male non-fiction writers
English male Shakespearean actors
English male stage actors
English male television actors
English male voice actors
English non-fiction writers
English people of Armenian descent
English people of Arab descent
English people of Iraqi descent
English theatre directors
Former Roman Catholics
Male motion capture actors
Method actors
People from Crouch End
Outstanding Performance by a Cast in a Motion Picture Screen Actors Guild Award winners
People educated at St Benedict's School, Ealing
People from Ruislip
Socialist Workers Party (UK) members